"Witchery" is a song by Australian band Little River Band, released in July 1977 as the second single from the group's third studio album, Diamantina Cocktail. The song peaked at number 33 on the Australian Kent Music Report singles chart.

Track listing
Australian 7" (EMI 11491)
Side A. "Witchery" - 3:07
Side B. "L.A. in the Sunshine" - 3:00

Charts

References 

1977 singles
Little River Band songs
1976 songs
EMI Records singles